Andrzej Perka (born 16 February 1941) is a Polish former basketball player. He competed in the men's tournament at the 1964 Summer Olympics.

References

1941 births
Living people
Polish men's basketball players
Olympic basketball players of Poland
Basketball players at the 1964 Summer Olympics
Basketball players from Warsaw